The Women's Party was an Australian political party which was registered on 20 February 2019. Its policies relate to women's rights, such as equal representation of women in parliament and equal pay. It also supports anti-corruption policies, the rights of First Nations and indigenous Australians, and action on climate change. It was founded by transgender woman Divvi de Vendre, who was the party's lead candidate for the Senate in the 2019 federal election.

The party was de-registered by the Australian Electoral Commission on 11 June 2021.

References

Defunct political parties in Australia
Political parties established in 2019
2019 establishments in Australia
Political parties disestablished in 2021